Cylisticus is a genus of woodlice in the family Cylisticidae. There are at least 70 described species in Cylisticus.

Species
These 70 species belong to the genus Cylisticus:

 Cylisticus albomaculatus Borutzkii, 1957
 Cylisticus anatolicus Verhoeff, 1949
 Cylisticus annulicornis Verhoeff, 1908
 Cylisticus anophthalmus Silvestri, 1897
 Cylisticus aprutianus Taiti & Manicastri, 1980
 Cylisticus armenicus Borutzkii, 1961
 Cylisticus arnoldi Borutzkii, 1961
 Cylisticus arnoldii Borutzky, 1961
 Cylisticus bergomatius Verhoeff, 1928
 Cylisticus biellensis Verhoeff, 1930
 Cylisticus birsteini Borutzkii, 1961
 Cylisticus brachyurus Radu, 1951
 Cylisticus caprariae Ferrara & Taiti, 1978
 Cylisticus carinatus Budde-Lund, 1885?
 Cylisticus caucasius Verhoeff, 1917
 Cylisticus cavernicola Racovitza, 1907
 Cylisticus cavernicolus Racovitza, 1907
 Cylisticus ciscaucasius Borutzkii, 1961
 Cylisticus convexus (De Geer, 1778) (curly woodlouse)
 Cylisticus cretaceus Borutzkii, 1957
 Cylisticus dentifrons Budde-Lund, 1885
 Cylisticus desertorum Borutzkii, 1957
 Cylisticus discolor Verhoeff, 1949
 Cylisticus dobati Strouhal, 1971
 Cylisticus esterelanus Verhoeff, 1917
 Cylisticus estest Verhoeff, 1931
 Cylisticus giljarovi Borutzkii, 1977
 Cylisticus gracilipennis Budde-Lund, 1879
 Cylisticus igiliensis Taiti & Ferrara, 1980
 Cylisticus iners Budde-Lund, 1880
 Cylisticus inferus Verhoeff, 1917
 Cylisticus kosswigi Strouhal, 1953
 Cylisticus lencoranensis Borutzkii, 1977
 Cylisticus ligurinus Verhoeff, 1936
 Cylisticus littoralis Ferrara & Taiti, 1978
 Cylisticus lobatus Ferrara & Taiti, 1985
 Cylisticus lobulatus Strouhal, 1953
 Cylisticus major Radu, 1951
 Cylisticus masalicus Kashani, 2016
 Cylisticus mechthildae Strouhal, 1971
 Cylisticus mitis Budde-Lund, 1885
 Cylisticus montanus Vandel, 1980
 Cylisticus montivagus Verhoeff, 1949
 Cylisticus mrovdaghensis Borutzkii, 1961
 Cylisticus nasatus Verhoeff, 1931
 Cylisticus nasutus Verhoeff, 1931
 Cylisticus nivicomes Verhoeff, 1949
 Cylisticus opacus Arcangeli, 1939
 Cylisticus orientalis Borutzkii, 1939
 Cylisticus ormeanus Verhoeff, 1930
 Cylisticus pallidus Verhoeff, 1928
 Cylisticus pierantonii Arcangeli, 1923
 Cylisticus pontremolensis Verhoeff, 1936
 Cylisticus pugionifer Verhoeff, 1943
 Cylisticus racovitzai Vandel, 1957
 Cylisticus rotabilis Budde-Lund, 1885
 Cylisticus rotundifrons Schmalfuss, 1986
 Cylisticus sarmaticus Borutzkii, 1977
 Cylisticus silsilesii (Vandel, 1980)
 Cylisticus silvestris Borutzkii, 1957
 Cylisticus strouhali Borutzkii, 1977
 Cylisticus suberorum Verhoeff, 1931
 Cylisticus transsilvanicus Verhoeff, 1908
 Cylisticus transsilvaticus Verhoeff, 1908
 Cylisticus transsylvanicus Verhoeff, 1908
 Cylisticus uncinatus Taiti & Ferrara, 1996
 Cylisticus urartuensis Borutzkii, 1961
 Cylisticus urgonis Taiti & Ferrara, 1980
 Cylisticus vandeli Taiti & Ferrara, 1980
 Cylisticus zangezuricus Borutzkii, 1961

References

External links

 

Isopoda
Articles created by Qbugbot